Jarkko Erkki Hurme (born 4 June 1986) is a Finnish footballer who plays as a defender, primarily as a right back.

Club career 
Born in Oulu, Hurme, a right back, started his career at OLS Oulu and AC Oulu,
before moving to Veikkausliiga club RoPS for the 2005 season. He then transferred to Udinese Calcio of the Italian Serie A on 1 January 2006. He played for Hellas Verona in Serie C1 during the 2007–08 and 2008–09 seasons. In the summer 2009 he returned to AC Oulu and helped them to win Ykkönen.

Hurme later played for TPS, where he was the team's captain. He signed a two-year contract with the Norwegian Tippeligaen side Odd ahead of the 2014 season. He made his league debut on 20 May 2014, starting against Aalesund FK, helping his side to a 2–1 win at home.

International career 
Hurme was a regular for the Finnish Under-21 national team. He also played for Finland at the FIFA U-17 World Championship 2003.

Hurme earned his first cap for Finland in 2012 Baltic Cup against Estonia on 1 June 2012 in Tartu, Estonia. He came on as a substitute in the 63rd minute. He scored his first international goal in a home game against Greece in the Euro 2016 Qualifiers on 11 October 2014.

International goals
Scores and results lists Finland's goal tally first.

References

External links

1986 births
Living people
Sportspeople from Oulu
Association football defenders
Finnish footballers
Finland under-21 international footballers
Finland international footballers
Oulun Luistinseura players
AC Oulu players
Rovaniemen Palloseura players
Turun Palloseura footballers
Hellas Verona F.C. players
Udinese Calcio players
Odds BK players
Seinäjoen Jalkapallokerho players
Kokkolan Palloveikot players
Veikkausliiga players
Ykkönen players
Kakkonen players
Eliteserien players
Finnish expatriate footballers
Expatriate footballers in Italy
Finnish expatriate sportspeople in Italy
Expatriate footballers in Norway
Finnish expatriate sportspeople in Norway